The 2020 Swedish Golf Tour, titled as the 2020 MoreGolf Mastercard Tour for sponsorship reasons, was the 37th season of the Swedish Golf Tour.

The 2020 schedule initially consisted of 26 tournaments, 16 of them, in Sweden, Norway, Finland and Spain, included in the 2020 schedule. After a four-month break and rescheduling, due to the COVID-19 pandemic, the 2020 SGT schedule included 12 tournaments, two of them played in Spain in February and March, the remaining 10 in Sweden. Due to travel restrictions, four tournaments was taken away from the 2020 Nordic Golf League Order of Merit Golfbox Road to Europe, but was still counted on the 2020 MoreGolf Mastercard Tour and still earned OWGR points.

Qualifying School for the 2021 Swedish Golf Tour and Nordic Golf League season took place 30 September – 1 October 2020 over 36 holes at Barsebäck Golf & Country Club, Stockholm Golf Club and Kungsbacka Golf Club simultaneously.

Schedule 
The following table lists official events during the 2020 season.

Order of Merit
The Order of Merit was titled as the MoreGolf Mastercard Tour Ranking and was based on prize money won during the season, calculated using a points-based system.

See also
2020 Danish Golf Tour
2020 Swedish Golf Tour (women)

Notes

References

External links
Moregolf Mastercard Tour

Swedish Golf Tour
Swedish Golf Tour